The 1993 Vuelta a España was the 48th edition of the Vuelta a España, one of cycling's Grand Tours. The Vuelta began in A Coruña, with an individual time trial on 26 April, and Stage 12 occurred on 7 May with a stage from Benasque. The race finished in Santiago de Compostela on 16 May.

Stage 12
7 May 1993 — Benasque to Zaragoza,

Stage 13
8 May 1993 — Zaragoza to Zaragoza,  (ITT)

Stage 14
9 May 1993 — Tudela to Alto de la Cruz de la Demanda (Ezcaray),

Stage 15
10 May 1993 — Santo Domingo de la Calzada to Santander,

Stage 16
11 May 1993 — Santander to Alto Campoo,

Stage 17
12 May 1993 — Santander to Lakes of Covadonga,

Stage 18
13 May 1993 — Cangas de Onís to Gijón,

Stage 19
14 May 1993 — Gijón to Alto del Naranco,

Stage 20
15 May 1993 — Salas to Ferrol,

Stage 21
16 May 1993 — Padrón to Santiago de Compostela,  (ITT)

References

12
1993,12